Mircea Bornescu (born 3 May 1980 in Bucharest) is a Romanian former footballer who played as a goalkeeper.

Controversy
During a league game against Gaz Metan on 29 May 2013, Bornescu was sent off for biting opponent Tha'er Bawab, his victim was sent off for a retaliatory punch to the face, and five other players also received red cards.

Personal life
His father, Petre was a boxer who was national champion in 1986 and 1987.

Honours
Universitatea Craiova
Divizia B: 2005–06
Petrolul Ploiești
Cupa României: 2012–13
FC Voluntari
Cupa României: 2016–17

References

External links

1980 births
Footballers from Bucharest
Living people
Romanian footballers
Association football goalkeepers
ASC Daco-Getica București players
FC Progresul București players
CSM Unirea Alba Iulia players
FC U Craiova 1948 players
FC Rapid București players
Kavala F.C. players
FC Petrolul Ploiești players
FC Universitatea Cluj players
FC Voluntari players
Liga I players
Liga II players